Manuela Levorato (born 16 March 1977, in Dolo) is an Italian sprinter, who specializes in the 100 and 200 metres.

She won eight medals at the International athletics championships and games.

Biography
At the 2002 European Championships Levorato won a bronze medal in these two events. She also competed at the World Championships in 1999, 2001 and 2005.

Her personal best times are 11.14 s (100 m, 2001) and 22.60 s (200 m, 1999).

Achievements

National titles
Manuela Levorato has won 15 times the individual national championship.
4 wins in 100 metres (1999, 2001, 2002, 2010)
1 wins in 200 metres (2001)
7 wins in 60 metres indoor (1998, 1999, 2000, 2002, 2003, 2004, 2011)
3 wins in 200 metres indoor (2002, 2003, 2004)

See also
 Italian all-time lists - 100 metres
 Italian all-time lists - 200 metres
 Italian all-time lists - 400 metres
 Italian all-time lists - 4x100 metres relay
 Italy national relay team

References

External links

1977 births
Living people
People from Dolo
Italian female sprinters
Athletics competitors of Centro Sportivo Aeronautica Militare
European Athletics Championships medalists
Mediterranean Games silver medalists for Italy
Mediterranean Games bronze medalists for Italy
Athletes (track and field) at the 1997 Mediterranean Games
Athletes (track and field) at the 2001 Mediterranean Games
World Athletics Championships athletes for Italy
Mediterranean Games medalists in athletics
Sportspeople from the Metropolitan City of Venice
20th-century Italian women
21st-century Italian women